General Sir Sydney Frederick Muspratt  (11 September 1878 –  28 November 1972) was a senior British Indian Army officer who went on to be Military Secretary to the India Office.

He was born 11 September 1878 the son of Henry Muspratt, Indian Civil Service.

Military career
Muspratt was commissioned into the Indian Staff Corps in 1898. He served extensively on the North West Frontier of India. He was appointed to the 12th Cavalry 1 April 1900.

He was first appointed to the staff as Staff Captain, Intelligence and General Staff Officer 3rd Class from 18 June 1906 to 17 June 1910, during which time he served on the Mohmand and Zakka Khel expeditions of 1908.

He is reappointed to the staff serving World War I from 5 September 1914 and spent the war in France & Belgium as a staff officer, ending up a General Staff Officer 1st Class from 18 January 1918 to 31 October 1920.

He did a brief stint as Deputy Director (Intelligence) in India from 1 November 1920 to 15 December 1920 before returning to  regimental soldiering with the 12th Cavalry until be appointed to the staff at the War Office from 3 February 1922 to 6 October 1925.

Returning to India he was appointed a Brigade commander, 4th Indian Infantry Brigade from 17 November 1925 to 31 October 1927. Then he was made Director of Military Operations in India 1 November 1927 to 25 October 1929. Subsequently he was appointed Deputy Chief of the General Staff and Director of Staff Duties at Army Headquarters, India 13 December 1929 to 6 September 1931.

He was Military Secretary to the India Office from 1931 to 1933. Then as General Officer Commanding Peshawar District from 26 November 1933 to 1 November 1936, he commanded the latter part of the Second Mohmand Campaign. He was Military Secretary to the India Office again from 1937 to 1941.

Personal life
In 1925, he married Rosamonde Barry, youngest daughter of Sir Edward Barry, 2nd Baronet, and they went on to have two sons, John Scott and David Barry.

He died at 43 Broad Street, Alresford, Hampshire, aged 94.

References

 

|-
 

1878 births
1972 deaths
Indian Army personnel of World War I
Indian Army generals of World War II
British Indian Army generals
Knights Commander of the Order of the Bath
Companions of the Order of the Star of India
Companions of the Order of the Indian Empire
Companions of the Distinguished Service Order
Indian Staff Corps officers
People from Battersea
Military personnel from Surrey
British people in colonial India